The Alvis Fourteen also known as TA 14 was the first car to be produced by major defence contractor Alvis cars after World War II. The entire car factory had been destroyed on the night of Thursday 14 November 1940. Announced in November 1946 it was made until 1950 when its postwar austerity 1900 cc engine was replaced by the 2993 cc  26.25 HP (tax rating) Alvis Three Litre or TA 21.

First postwar Alvis
The Fourteen was available as a four-door sports saloon built for Alvis by Mulliners of Birmingham but there were also Tickford and Carbodies drophead versions.  When compared with the 12/70 car it replaced the interior is 4 inches wider and the distance between rear-seat armrests is increased almost 5 inches.

Engine
The 1892 cc engine is a slightly larger-bore version of the one used in the 12/70 and produced . It is fitted with a single SU type H4 -inch side-draught carburettor. Inlet valves have been enlarged. The triplex chain drive has been given an automatic tensioner. The engine's exhaust system has been extensively revised and the direction of flow of cooling water around the engine has been substantially changed.

Brakes suspension steering
The bodies were mounted on an updated pre-war Alvis 12/70 chassis that was widened and lengthened but retained the rigid-axle leaf spring suspension. Employing Silentbloc bushes (except at the front of the front springs to maintain steering precision) it is controlled by double acting Armstrong hydraulic dampers. Hypoid bevel final drive was fitted for the first time and greatly reduced the height of the transmission tunnel. Steering is by Marles with a spring spoked steering wheel. Mechanically operated brakes are two-leading-shoe type by Girling. Disc wheels replaced the 12/70's wire wheels and are fitted with larger tyres.

Road test
Autocar reported the new car had the typical Alvis refined sure-footed and lively performance. Its synchromesh "worked like a charm". The Motor said the car was much roomier than the compact close-coupled exterior suggested, rear seat knee-room was between 8 and 13 inches. A most impressive car with a flexible 4-cylinder engine. Wind noise was noticeable at high speed.

References

Further reading

External links

 Fourteen with body by Duncan Industries

TA 14
Cars introduced in 1946
1950s cars